Gyalopion is a genus of small nonvenomous colubrid snakes. Species in the genus Gyalopion are commonly referred to as hooknose snakes, and are native to the southwestern United States and Mexico.

Taxonomy
The following species and subspecies are recognized:
 
Gyalopion canum  – western hook-nosed snake
Gyalopion quadrangulare  – desert hook-nosed snake
Gyalopion quadrangulare desertorum 
Gyalopion quadrangulare quadrangulare 

Nota bene: A binomial authority or trinomial authority in parentheses indicates that the species or subspecies was originally described in a genus other than Gyalopion.

Geographic range
G. canum is found in the United States (Arizona, New Mexico, Texas), and in Mexico (Chihuahua, Coahuila, Durango, Jalisco, Michoacán, Nuevo León, San Luis Potosí, Sonora, Zacatecas).

G. quadrangulare is found in the United States (Arizona), and in Mexico (Sinaloa, Sonora).

Habitat
Hooknose snakes prefer shortgrass prairie habitats.

Description
Dorsally, the base color of hook-nosed snakes is light brown, which is overlaid with darker brown crossbands. The ventral color is white or cream-colored. The most distinguishing feature of hook-nosed snakes is an upturned snout, which has a concave rostral scale, as opposed to hognose snakes which have a keeled rostral scale. Species of Gyalopion rarely grow beyond 25.5 cm (10 inches) in total length (including tail).

Behavior
Hooknose snakes are nocturnal and secretive snakes, generally found hiding under rocks, or buried in the soil.

Diet
The primary diet of hook-nosed snakes consists of spiders and centipedes.

Reproduction
Species in the genus Gyalopion are oviparous.

References

Further reading
Cope ED (1860). "Catalogue of the Colubridæ in the Museum of the Academy of Natural Sciences of Philadelphia, with notes and descriptions of new species. Part 2". Proc. Acad. Nat. Sci. Philadelphia 12: 241–266. (Gyalopion, new genus, p. 243).

External links
Herps of Texas: Gyalopion canum

Colubrids
Snake genera
Taxa named by Edward Drinker Cope